Edwin Wilcox (born 1841) was a one term Democratic mayor of South Norwalk, Connecticut in 1890. He had previously served as clerk to the South Norwalk Common Council from 1872 to 1873, 1876, and from 1877 to 1887. He was partner in the grocery store Brown and Wilcox at 49 Washington Street. He also served as treasurer of the South Norwalk water fund.

When the South Norwalk Library became a city department, he appointed its first board of directors.

References 

1841 births
American grocers
City and town clerks
Connecticut Democrats
Mayors of Norwalk, Connecticut
Year of death missing